Tuomas Mäkipää is an Anglican clergyman of Finnish Lutheran origin. He studied theology at Helsinki University.

Mäkipää was ordained deacon by The Rt Revd Geoffrey Rowell, Bishop of Gibraltar in Europe, at Mikael Agricola Church, Helsinki in May 2005. He served as an assistant curate in the Chaplaincy of St Nicholas, Helsinki and was ordained priest by the Rt Revd David Hamid, suffragan bishop of the Diocese in Europe, in 2010. He was the first Finnish Lutheran ordained in the Church of England under the Porvoo Agreement. He was appointed as Chaplain of the Chaplaincy of St Nicholas in 2012.

In 2015, Mäkipää was elected to the Church of England’s General Synod. In February 2016, he was commissioned Assistant Area Dean for Finland. In June the same year, he was elected chair of the House of Clergy of the Diocese in Europe’s diocesan synod. He is also on the clergy roster of the Estonian Evangelical Lutheran Church.

References

1978 births
Living people
21st-century Church of England clergy
21st-century Finnish Lutheran clergy
Anglican chaplains